The 1997–98 Coppa Italia, the 51st Coppa Italia was an Italian Football Federation domestic cup competition won by Lazio.

Preliminary round

Round of 32

Round of 16

p=after penalty shoot-out

Quarter-finals

Semi-finals

Final

First leg

Second leg

Lazio win 3–2 on aggregate.

Top goalscorers

References
rsssf.com

Coppa Italia seasons
Coppa Italia, 1997-98
Coppa Italia, 1997-98